Izvorul cu Hotar River may refer to:

 Izvorul cu Hotar, a tributary of the Latorița in Vâlcea County
 Izvorul cu Hotar, a tributary of the Lotru in Vâlcea County

See also 
 Hotar River (disambiguation)
 Hotaru River (disambiguation)
 Hotarul River (disambiguation)